Melinda Smith (born November 30, 1982), known by her stage name Mercedes Carrera, is an American pornographic actress and blogger. She was a well-known public supporter of Gamergate, and a frequent critic of feminist media critic Anita Sarkeesian.

Biography

Early years 
Born Melinda Smith, she descends from an interracial couple consisting of White and Puerto Rican parents. She was formerly an engineer before transitioning into the adult industry. Carrera is autistic, something which she describes as a "blessing" even though it was originally thought to be a "curse".

Career 
Carrera has appeared in more than 200 films. Carrera is known for her performances in films which focused on the MILF subgenres, specially "Cougar" and "Latin". She has worked in film productions for Brazzers, Reality Kings, Wicked Pictures, Digital Playground and Evil Angel, among others.

Carrera and her husband are involved in Freemasonry. Carrera describes her family as having an extensive history with the society. She was a member of the Order of the Eastern Star.

In 2015, the pro-Gamergate group The Fine Young Capitalists worked with Carrera to create a scholarship for students studying in STEM fields. Fundraising included a live webcam show featuring Carrera; $11,280 was raised.

Arrest 
On February 5, 2019, Carrera was arrested along with her boyfriend Jason Whitney (aka Daemon Cins) at their home in Rancho Cucamonga on child molestation charges. Both of them are accused, among other things, of the eightfold abuse of a girl under the age of 10, illegal drug possession, and illegal firearms possession.
After four years of being incarcerated, they are still waiting for a trial.

Awards and nominations
AVN Awards
2016
Nomination: Best All-Girl Group Sex Scene - Sisterhood
Nomination: Hottest MILF (Fan Award)
Nomination: MILF Performer of the Year
2017
Nomination: Best Supporting Actress - Project Pandora
Nomination: Best Virtual Reality Sex Scene - Kim Kardashian Supertar VR Experience
Nomination: MILF Performer of the Year
2018
Nomination: Best All-Girl Group Sex Scene - MILF Performer of the Year 2017
Nomination: Best Three-Way Sex Scene (B/B/G) - Forked
Nomination: MILF Performer of the Year
2019
Nomination: Best Actress, Feature Movie - Second First Date
Nomination: MILF Performer of the Year
GayVN Awards
2019 Nomination: Best Bi Sex Scene - Coming Out Bi 4
Transgender Erotica Awards
2018 Nomination: Best Non-TS Performer
2019 Nomination: Best Non-TS Female Performer
NightMoves Awards
2015 
Nomination: Best New Starlet (Editor's Choice)
Nomination: Best New Starlet (Fan's Choice)
Spank Bank Awards
2017 Nomination: Most Magnificent MILF
2018
Nomination: Exotic Femme Fatale of the Year
Nomination: Group/Orgy Maestro of the Year
Nomination: Most Volumptous Vixen
XBIZ Awards
2016 Nomination: MILF Performer of the Year
2017
Nomination: Best Actress, Couples-Themed Release - Forked
Nomination: Best Sex Scene, All-Girl - Project Pandora
Nomination: Best Sex Scene, Couples-Themed Release - Forked
Nomination: MILF Performer of the Year
2018
Nomination: Best Sex Scene, Couples-Themed Release - Ingenue
Nomination: MILF Performer of the Year
2019
Nomination: Best Sex Scene, Couples-Themed Release - Making Ends Meet
Nomination: Best Sex Scene, Gonzo Release - Mother Fuckin' Anal
Nomination: Best Sex Scene, Vignette Release - MILF Stories: Still Sexy
Nomination: MILF Performer of the Year
XCritic Awards
2018 
Nomination: Best Actress - Second First Date
Nomination: Best MILF Performer
Nomination: Social Media Queen
XRCO Awards
2016 Nomination: MILF Performer of the Year
2017 Nomination: MILF Performer of the Year

References

External links
 

Living people
American pornographic film actresses
Pornographic film actors from California
Actresses from Los Angeles
Place of birth missing (living people)
Order of the Eastern Star
Freemasonry
1982 births
American Freemasons